Thomas Ickham (died 1415), of Canterbury, Kent, was an English politician.

Family
Ickham was married, before 1380, to a woman named Joan, a widow. They had one son, William Ickham, also an MP.

Career
Ickham was a Member of Parliament for Canterbury constituency in May 1382, January 1390, 1395 and 1401.

References

Year of birth missing
1415 deaths
People from Canterbury
14th-century births
English MPs May 1382
English MPs January 1390
English MPs 1395
English MPs 1401